Paul Mick is an Australian former professional tennis player.

Mick, who comes from Melbourne, was a junior quarter-finalist at the 1984 Australian Open.

During the 1980s he featured regularly in the singles qualifying draws for the Australian Open. His only main draw appearance came in the men's doubles, partnering Richard Cahill at the 1988 Australian Open.

He won the Tasmania Challenger doubles title in 1988.

Challenger titles

Doubles: (1)

References

External links
 
 

Year of birth missing (living people)
Living people
Australian male tennis players
Tennis people from Victoria (Australia)
20th-century Australian people